The House of Truth was an early 20th century establishment in Washington, D.C. associated with American liberal opposition to Republican leadership.

Further reading 

 
 
 
 

Dupont Circle
Liberalism in the United States
1912 establishments in Washington, D.C.